Hyrcanypena is a monotypic genus of moths of the family Noctuidae containing the single species Hyrcanypena schwingenschussi. It was described by Wagner in 1937. It is found in Iran.

References

External links 
 Natural History Museum Lepidoptera genus database

Hypeninae
Moths described in 1937
Monotypic moth genera